Adelius is a genus of parasitoid wasps in the family Braconidae, first described in 1833 by Alexander Henry Haliday.

Species
 Adelius angustus (Papp, 1997)
 Adelius australiensis (Ashmead, 1900)
 Adelius clandestinus Foerster, 1851
 Adelius determinatus Foerster, 1851
 Adelius dubius Foerster, 1851
 Adelius erythronotus Foerster, 1851
 Adelius germanus (Haliday, 1834)
 Adelius hyalinipennis Foerster, 1851
 Adelius parvulus Foerster, 1851
 Adelius pyrrhia (Beirne, 1945)
 Adelius subfasciatus Haliday, 1833
 Adelius viator Foerster, 1851

References

Braconidae genera
Braconidae
Taxa named by Alexander Henry Haliday
Taxa described in 1833